Jan Dungel (born 23 March 1951 in Kyjov) is a Czech painter, graphic artist and illustrator. A member of the Union of Visual Artists of the Czech Republic, he is especially noted for his paintings and drawings of animals, particularly birds. He has been painting and documenting birds in South America since 1992.

Books
Pantanal and Llanos, Extrapublishing s.r.o. 2013,  
http://issuu.com/jan.dungel/docs/wetlands_en/1?e=2747550/4434469
Painting the Jungle, Academia 2006, 
http://issuu.com/jan.dungel/docs/painting_the_jungle/1?e=2747550/4435892
Deep in the Jungle (Po krk v pralese), Euromedia 2009,  (English e-book only)
http://issuu.com/jan.dungel/docs/deep_web/1?e=2747550/4435865

See also
List of Czech painters

References

External links

1951 births
Living people
People from Kyjov
Czech painters
Czech male painters
Czech graphic designers
Czech illustrators